The first seed and home favourite Caroline Wozniacki defeated Klára Zakopalová 6–2, 7–6(7–5) in the final.

Seeds

Main draw

Finals

Top half

Bottom half

External links
 Main draw
 Qualifying draw

Danish Open (tennis)
E-Boks Danish Open - Singles